von Humboldt may refer to:

 Alexander von Humboldt (1769–1859), Prussian naturalist and explorer
 Caroline von Humboldt (1766–1829), German salonnière and art historian
 Wilhelm von Humboldt (1767–1835), Prussian minister, linguist and philosopher

See also 
 Alexander von Humboldt (disambiguation)
 Humboldt (disambiguation)